The Department of Treasury is a department of the Government of Western Australia. The department is responsible for principal economic and financial advice to the state government.

The department was one of the few that remained mostly unaffected by the 2017 restructuring of the Western Australian government departments, which resulted in the number of departments being reduced from 41 to 25.

References

External links
 Government of Western Australia website
 Department of Treasury

Treasury
Government finances in Australia